Fermín "Mike" Guerra Romero (October 11, 1912 – October 9, 1992) was a Cuban professional baseball catcher who played in Major League Baseball (MLB) for the Washington Senators (1937; 1944–46; 1951), Philadelphia Athletics (1947–50) and Boston Red Sox (1951). Guerra also played Cuban Winter League baseball for two decades, 1934–55.

Guerra was born in Havana. In nine Major League seasons, he played in 565 games. In 1,581 at bats and 1,750 plate appearances; Guerra recorded 168 runs scored, 382 hits, 42 doubles, 14 triples, nine home runs, 168 runs batted in (RBI), 25 stolen bases, 131 bases on balls, a .242 batting average, .300 on-base percentage, .303 slugging percentage, 479 total bases, and 37 sacrifice hits.

Guerra died in Miami Beach, Florida, two days before his 80th birthday.

References

External links

1912 births
1992 deaths
Albany Senators players
American people of Cuban descent
Angeles de Puebla players
Boston Red Sox players
Caribbean Series managers
Charlotte Hornets (baseball) players
Chattanooga Lookouts players
Detroit Tigers scouts
Greenville Spinners players
Havana Cubans players
Havana Sugar Kings players
Leones de Yucatán players
Major League Baseball catchers
Major League Baseball players from Cuba
Cuban expatriate baseball players in the United States
Philadelphia Athletics players
Salisbury Indians players
Springfield Nationals players
Trenton Senators players
Washington Senators (1901–1960) players
York White Roses players